Tanzim Hurras al-Din (transliteration: , Guardians of Religion Organization or Guardians of Religion) commonly referred to as Hurras al-Din, is an armed insurgent group affiliated with Al-Qaeda and fighting in the Syrian Civil War. The head of the group, Abu Humam al-Shami, was a Syrian who fought for Al-Qaeda in Afghanistan and the Iraqi insurgency. Formerly a member of Hay'at Tahrir al-Sham and previously the al-Nusra Front, al-Qaeda's branch in Syria between 2013 and 2016; Abu Humam Al-Shami announced the formation of Hurras al-Din on 27 February 2018. Abu Jilibib Tubasi and Abu Khadija al-Urduni, members of the Guardians of Religion's shura council, left Jabhat Fateh al-Sham in 2016 due to its reported disassociation from al-Qaeda. Tubasi, al-Shami, and Sami al-Oraydi were arrested by HTS in November 2017, in an attempt to stave off the formation of another al-Qaeda affiliated group in Syria. Also, in November 2017, Jaysh al-Badia and Jaysh al-Malahim were formed. The group also rejects infighting against other groups, but has had some tensions with Hayat Tahrir al-Sham on a few occasions, most recently from 17 June to 26 June 2020.

History
In February 2018, the group stated that it is opposed to the fighting between the Syrian Liberation Front and Tahrir al-Sham. However Jaysh al-Sahel, which is part of the Guardians of Religion Organization said that it will fight the SLF if the towns of Muhambal, Bisanqul, and Kafr Shalaya are attacked.

On 26 April 2018, the Guardians of Religion Organization, along with Ansar al-Tawhid, and Jaysh al-Izza, launched a joint attack against Syrian Government forces in the northern countryside of the Hama Governorate.

On 12 October 2018, the Russian government's reconciliation center in Syria accused the group of hoarding materials needed to develop chemical weapons for a false flag attack as well as being an ISIL affiliate. Along with Russian officials accusing the group of being an ISIL affiliate Iraqi media has claimed the group is also an ISIL affiliate operating along the Syrian-Iraqi border, however the group's base of operations is in the Idlib governorate of Syria, the group has not claimed any attacks outside the region nor have any other reports of activity outside of Syria been reported.

On 15 October 2018, the group published a video filmed in Saraqib which showed the group's religious police, the hisbah, driving around the city with loudspeakers calling on people to adhere to sharia.

On 29 December 2018, one of the group's founders, named Abu Julaybib, was killed by government forces in the Daraa Governorate while  preparing to establish an insurgent cell linked to the group in southern Syria.

On 30 June 2019, in a rare operation against non-ISIL elements, the U.S. carried out a strike against an al-Qaeda in Syria (AQ-S) leadership meeting at a training facility west of Aleppo, which killed eight jihadists from the Guardians of Religion Organization, including six commanders: two Tunisians, two Algerians, an Egyptian and a Syrian. It was the first known U.S. strike in western Syria since February 2017 due to the U.S. and Russia arranging an unofficial deconfliction boundary that largely bars any substantial U.S. forces from venturing into the region. The U.S. did not specify what assets were used in the strike.

On 31 August 2019, the U.S. carried out a series of airstrikes on a Rouse the Believers Operations Room meeting between Kafriya and Maarrat Misrin, killing over 40 Guardians of Religion militants, including several leaders.

On 27 October 2019, members of the group were killed during a US raid targeting ISIL's leader Abu Bakr al-Baghdadi in Barisha. A commander of the group named Abu Muhammad al-Halabi, the owner of the house Baghdadi was staying at, was killed during the raid. An Iraqi intelligence official and Hisham al-Hashimi have stated to The Independent that Halabi was also a smuggler, which is why the ISIL head and his family utilized his services.

On 10 March 2020, The Guardians of Religion Organization raided the town of Tanjarah, which was under control of the Syrian Army, and captured the town. Heavy fighting took place following a counterattack by the Syrian army to retake the town. 35 soldiers of the Syrian Army and 13 HaD fighters were killed in the fighting.

After a fallout within the Rouse the Believers Operation Room, the group joined four other jihadist groups on 12 June 2020 to form the "Be Steadfast Operation Room."

On 23 June, after putting up checkpoints around Idlib and refusing to take them down at Hayat Tahrir al-Sham requests an open conflict began between the two groups. The conflict killed 18 member of Hurras al-Din, 11 members of Hayat Tahrir al-Sham, and one civilian.

On 1 January 2021, the group attacked a Russian military base in the northern part of the Raqqa Governorate, in an area held by the Syrian Democratic Forces. The attack was notable for being carried outside of the group's main areas of operation in the Idlib Governorate. During the attack, five members of the group were killed carrying out suicide bombings and injuring between two to three Russian soldiers at the base.

Relations with other groups
The Guardians of Religion Organization is part of the Stand Firm Operations Room, formerly the Rouse the Believers or Incite the Believers Operations Room. The Stand Firm Operations Room is the reconsolidation of the Incite the Believers Operations Room following Ansar al Tawhid's defection from it 3 May 2020. The Incite the Believers Operations Room was led by the Guardians of Religion Organization alongside three other Jihadist factions based in northwestern Syria, and alongside Ansar al-Tawhid, which was also part of the Rouse the Believers Operations Room and largely consists of former Jund al-Aqsa elements, established the Alliance to Support Islam in early 2018.

al-Qaeda
The group broke away from Hayat Tahrir al-Sham in 2018 a year after the formation of Hayat Tahrir al-Sham due to internal tensions in the organization over issues including its allegiance to al-Qaeda and its leaders, furthermore the Khorasan Group that was believed by several intelligence agencies and analysts to be part of al-Nusra which later became HTS, is thought to have evolved into becoming part of the Guardians of Religion Organization. Al-Qaeda also reportedly sent senior cadres from its central command nodes in Afghanistan, Pakistan, and Iran to support the foundation of the Guardians of Religion Organization.

ISIL

The group has instructed its members not to associate with ISIL with threat of expulsion from the group and prosecution, while ISIL declared the group to be heretical in its weekly newspaper al-Naba.

However, there are believed to be ISIL-sympathizers in the Guardians of Religion Organization, and prior to the group's foundation as it began as a sub faction of Hayat Tahrir al-Sham in 2017 the year of Hayat Tahrir al-Sham's inception, ISIL reportedly began building ties with these elements prior to the group's formal foundation.

ISIL also began building a contingency plan upon their decline that involved regrouping in opposition held parts of Idlib, including asking the Syrian Democratic Forces during the Battle of Baghuz Fawqani for passage out of the area to Idlib with assistance from the Guardians of Religion Organization, and the group playing a role in the process, with ISIL infiltrating it, by recruiting members of the group sympathetic to ISIL to act as agents including senior leadership, as well as facilitating a flow of displaced fighters from former ISIL-held territories and strongholds to Idlib to join the Guardians of Religion Organization, then carrying out assassinations and sabotage campaigns against individuals in the group and other groups and individuals opposed to ISIL, then formally declaring allegiance to ISIL, when ISIL saw the time as right.

In 2018, Iraqi media and security officials claimed to have captured members of the Guardians of Religion Organization embedded with ISIL fighters from the Syrian border town of Abu Kamal on the Iraqi border heading towards Iraq's Anbar Governorate, and that the group was seeking to expand its presence to northern and central Iraq, and that it was also working with the Army of the Men of the Naqshbandi Order, which is led by former Saddam Hussein-era Baathist officers, including Izzat Ibrahim al-Douri, the Iraqi government also claimed local political parties were financing the group to help it expand into former ISIL-held territories, however the validity of the reports has been questioned.

Prior the foundation the Guardians of Religion Organization, Sami al-Oraydi, who holds an influential position in the group, criticized ISIL and claimed they were Kharijites, and called them "Muslim Killers", he also said that Abu Muhammad al-Adnani, ISIL's official spokesman at the time, was ignorant and didn't understand the things he said, as well as several posts on Twitter critical of ISIL, during his tenure as al-Nusra's top Sharia official.

In 2016, Saif al-Adel, an Egyptian al-Qaeda member who later became part of the Guardians of Religion Organization's leadership, also criticized ISIL saying they were twisted and had perverted thoughts.

In January 2019, as part of a campaign a formation called "Free the female prisoners" was established, with the stated goals of freeing female ISIL prisoners held in Syrian Democratic Forces-run internment camps such as the Al-Hawl refugee camp. The formation is believed to be associated with the Guardians of Religion Organization. However, a separate campaign with the same goal launched by ISIL itself called "Kafel" has denounced the Free the Female Prisoners campaign as apostates. Free the Female Prisoners has denied being linked to either ISIL or the Guardians of Religion Organization and claims to be an independent organization willing to work with any faction to achieve their goal of freeing female ISIL prisoners.

In August 2019, an unofficial ISIL media outlet called the Muhajireen Foundation, which provides reports and updates on events that may affect ISIL foreign fighters displaced in Syria, released an infographic showing three separate anti-ISIL operations by HTS in Idlib. One of the raids carried out by HTS targeted members of the Guardians of Religion Organization and Ansar al-Tawhid who had ties to ISIL. Two of the arrested individuals were Egyptians. However previously in January 2019, the same foundation cautioned ISIL members displaced in Idlib to avoid large gatherings and avoid Hayat Tahrir al-Sham and the Guardians of Religion Organization, because HTS and the Guardians of Religion had arrested several ISIL members, the warning also called both HTS and the Guardians apostates.

In October 2019, based on a receipt book of ISIL reportedly found by associates of former American intelligence official Asaad Almohammad, analysts have stated that Baghdadi was paying the members of the group in exchange for hiding him. According to the receipts, ISIL paid at least $67,000 to them from early 2017 to mid-2018, including $7,000 in summer 2018 to prepare bases for ISIL fighters from "al-Khair province", hinting that they helped in smuggling ISIL members. Aymenn Jawad Al-Tamimi pointed to the fact that two groups opposition towards each other. However, Tamimi also speculated that some of the receipts obtained were fabrications, except the ones from March to July 2018 that he was shown.

It is also believed that some members might also be part of a pro-ISIL faction despite the group's official stance regarding ISIL which is critical and generally opposed to it, including reportedly instructing its members not to associate with ISIL  members, and ISIL viewing the group as heretical due to their support of the Taliban and al-Qaeda, as well as the group's hesitance to confront Hayat Tahrir al-Sham, despite tensions between the two.

Hayat Tahrir al-Sham
The group has held tensions with Hayat Tahrir al-Sham on numerous occasions but has largely avoided armed confrontation with HTS, with most of the tensions being confined to media campaigns against each other. In January 2019, the Guardians of Religion Organization accused HTS of being involved in a secret plan to establish a military council under the control of the mainstream Syrian opposition including ex-government defectors, that would be supervised by Turkey, the Guardians of Religion Organization also claimed that HTS was willing to open the M5 highway to traffic from government-held areas.

Though holding tensions with HTS, the leadership of the Guardians of Religion Organization is respected  among HTS members, reportedly causing hesitance for the two to openly fight each other, and HTS adopting a policy of containing the group rather than confronting it in open conflict.

On 7 February 2019, members of the Guardians of Religion Organization shot at a car with HTS members inside following tensions in January. The Guardians of Religion Organization later signed an agreement following the incident, and the Guardians of Religion Organization apologized for killing an HTS member killed by the gunfire. Over the following days afterwards several agreements were made between HTS and the Guardians of Religion Organization to deescalate tensions between the two.

In late October 2019, a faction of the Guardians of Religion Organization led by a cleric named Abu al-Yaman al-Wazzani separated from the Guardians of Religion Organization, and formed a new group called Ansar al-Haq. Wazzani and his supporters claimed that the Guardians of Religion Organization had not held up obligations that they believe the Guardians of Religion Organization promised to uphold, and believed the Guardians of Religion Organization was lacking in the enforcement of Sharia law, followers of Wazzani were mostly reported to be former Jund al-Aqsa and Faylaq al-Sham fighters. Ansar al-Haq was also critical of HTS and its relaxed policy regarding Sharia, believing that HTS allowed immorality and did not implement justice, and also viewed HTS as an oppressive body. After the formation of Ansar al-Haq, HTS arrested Wazzani and his followers. HTS also holds tensions with Jaysh Khorasan, a group close to the Guardians of Religion Organization.

Analysis
It is thought by the Israeli Intelligence and Terrorism Information Center that the formation of the group will weaken HTS. Alexander Sehmer of the Jamestown Foundation has stated that Guardians of the Religion Organization gives Al Qaeda the best opportunity to improve its fortunes in Syria.

Organization

Leadership
Abu Jilibib Tubasi, killed in December 2018
Bilal Khuraisat, also known as Abu Khadija al-Urduni, killed in December 2019
Sami al-Oraydi
Khalid al-Aruri, also known as Abu al-Qasem al-Urduni, killed in June 2020
Abu Abdul al-Rahman al-Maki
Saif al-Adel
Abu 'Abd al-Karim al-Masri
Abu Humam al-Shami
Sari Shihab, also known as Abu Khallad al-Muhandis, killed in August 2019
Abu Adnan al-Homsi, logistics and equipment commander, killed in June 2020
Abu Dhar al-Masri, killed on 15 October 2020
Abu Yusuf al-Maghribi, killed on 15 October 2020
Abu Hamzah al Yemeni, killed by drone strike in June 2022
Abu Ubaidah al-Iraqi, killed by drone strike in February 2023

References

External links
 

Salafi Jihadist groups
Qutbist organisations
Anti-government factions of the Syrian civil war
2018 establishments in Syria
Jihadist groups in Syria
Jihadist groups in Iraq
Branches of al-Qaeda
Organisations designated as terrorist by Australia